Honor Louisa Carter (née Dillon, born 14 July 1982 in Blenheim) is a field hockey player from New Zealand.

She has competed for the New Zealand women's national field hockey team since 2004, including for the team at the 2006 Commonwealth Games in Melbourne, Australia, the 2004 Champions Trophy Tournament in Rosario, Argentina and the 2006 Champions Trophy Tournament in Amstelveen, Netherlands.

Carter was first selected for the Black Sticks Women in November 2004 on the back of her performance for Canterbury in the National Hockey League that year.
She played her first match for the Black Sticks on 6 November 2004, against Argentina in Rosario, Argentina, as part of the 2004 Champions Trophy Tournament (top 6 teams in the world).

International tournaments

 2004 – Champions Trophy, Rosario
 2005 – Champions Challenge, Virginia Beach
 2006 – Commonwealth Games, Melbourne
 2006 – World Cup Qualifier, Rome
 2006 – Champions Trophy, Amstelveen

Personal life
Born in Blenheim to James and Maling Dillon, Carter spent most of her early life living in Wellington. She has two older sisters: Amber and Michal. Carter attended Chilton Saint James School, before later completing a double degree - Bachelor of Commerce (Marketing) and Bachelor of Science (Psychology) - at the University of Canterbury. She is currently studying a Bachelor of Nutrition and Naturopathy (BNat) in Auckland.

Carter became engaged to long term boyfriend Dan Carter, player of the New Zealand national rugby union team on 9 October 2010. The couple resided in Auckland, where she worked as a Marketing Manager for DB Breweries. The couple married at Timara Lodge, Marlborough on 9 December 2011. They have four sons.

References

1982 births
Living people
New Zealand female field hockey players
Field hockey players at the 2006 Commonwealth Games
Commonwealth Games competitors for New Zealand
Rugby union players' wives and girlfriends
People educated at Chilton Saint James School
Fell family
Buckland family
21st-century New Zealand women